The Woman in the Suitcase is a 1920 American silent drama film directed by Fred Niblo. A print of the film is held by the Library of Congress.

Plot
Mary's (Bennett) father James Moreland (Conklin) returns from a business trip to Philadelphia and while searching his suitcase for a promised present, she finds the autographed picture of Dolly Wright (Matthews). Mary does not inform her mother (McDowell) of this fact, but instead decides to save her father from this wicked woman. She advertises for an escort to take about town in a search of the Wright woman. Billy Friske (Lee), the son of the owner of the newspaper, answers the advertisement and they soon discover Moreland at a dance. Mary makes the acquaintance of the young woman and is soon invited to her apartment. There she meets her father, who sees the error of his ways and returns home with Mary. Mary is made happy by the faithful Billy and accepts him as her life partner.

Cast
 Enid Bennett as Mary Moreland
 William Conklin as James B. Moreland
 Dorcas Matthews as Dolly Wright
 Rowland V. Lee as W.H. 'Billy' Fiske (as Roland Lee)
 Claire McDowell as Mrs. James B. Moreland
 Donald MacDonald as 'Doc' Harrison (as Donald McDonald)
 Gladys George as Ethel

References

External links

1920 films
1920 drama films
American silent feature films
American black-and-white films
Films directed by Fred Niblo
Silent American drama films
1920s English-language films
1920s American films